Costerfield is a former mining locality in north central Victoria, Australia.
Alan Coster and Edwin Field. Prospectors who found gold in the locality in 1861. 

An Anglican school was opened in 1862 and closed in 1950. It was then reopned in 1962 and closed in 1992.

References

External links

Towns in Victoria (Australia)
Bendigo
Suburbs of Bendigo